Dominique Proust is a French astrophysicist and an organist. He is a research engineer at CNRS, Observatoire de Paris-Meudon.

Astronomy
After a doctoral thesis devoted to stellar physics, his work was directed towards cosmology: the formation and evolution of large structures in the universe, galaxies, quasars. He worked in the major international observatories, and observed with the large telescopes at Haute Provence, Pic du Midi, Canary Islands, Andalusia, Chile, California, and Hawaii.

Dominique Proust is one of the founders of the "Astronomie vers Tous" (Astronomy to All) of Paris Observatory in order to teach astronomy to those who would not otherwise have access. He teaches astrophysics in Sign Language for the deaf community.

In addition to his research and teaching, he is the author of several books on astronomy for the general public. He has co-produced music and science program and appears regularly on radio and television.

Music
Dominique Proust studied the organ with the organist of Notre Dame de Paris Pierre Moreau, Jacques Marichal, and Daniel Roth, the current organist of St. Sulpice, Paris. Dominique Proust is organist at the Church of Our Lady of the Assumption at Meudon. He is a member of the regional commission of the organ. He has given concerts in Europe, Canada, Brazil, Chile, Peru and Australia. International critics praised his recordings of William Herschel and Pierre Moreau.

Popular works
 Les étoiles, Collection Points Sciences, Le Seuil, 1996
 Les Galaxies et structure de l'Univers, Collection Points Sciences, Le Seuil 1997
 L'Harmonie des Sphères, Collection Science Ouverte, Le Seuil 2001
 Où sont les autres ?, Collection Science Ouverte, Le Seuil 2007
 Les mains dans les étoiles, Dictionnaire encyclopédique d'astronomie pour la Langue des Signes Française, avec Daniel Abbou, Nasro Chab, Yves Delaporte, Carole Marion et Blandine Proust, édition de Burillier 2010

References

People from Saône-et-Loire
Living people
French cosmologists
French classical organists
Theoretical physicists
French male organists
20th-century French physicists
20th-century organists
20th-century French musicians
21st-century organists
21st-century French physicists
21st-century French musicians
20th-century French male musicians
21st-century French male musicians
Year of birth missing (living people)
Male classical organists